The SNCF Class BB 71000 is a class of 30 centre-cab Bo-Bo diesel shunting locomotives. They were the last locomotives in service with SNCF to feature side rods. The class was withdrawn from traffic between 1998 and 1999. A number were sold on for industrial use.

References

71000
B-B locomotives
BB 71000
Standard gauge locomotives of France

Shunting locomotives